Josef Steiner (born 24 September 1950) is an Austrian long-distance runner. He competed in the marathon at the 1980 Summer Olympics.

References

1950 births
Living people
Athletes (track and field) at the 1980 Summer Olympics
Austrian male long-distance runners
Austrian male marathon runners
Olympic athletes of Austria
Sportspeople from Innsbruck
Austrian male cross country runners